Joshua Silburn may refer to:

Joshua Silburn, Sr., fictional character in The Messengers
Joshua Silburn, Jr., fictional character in The Messengers